The women's 500 metres in speed skating at the 1972 Winter Olympics took place on 10 February, at the Makomanai Open Stadium.

Records
Prior to this competition, the existing world and Olympic records were as follows:

The following new Olympic and World records was set during the competition.

Results

During her run, Henning had to stop to avoid a collision with Sylvia Burka at the crossover point. She won the race and the gold medal with a time of 43.70. Officials allowed her another run after the competition, where she broke the Olympic record.

References

Women's speed skating at the 1972 Winter Olympics
Olymp
Skat